Øvre Leirungen is a lake in Vågå Municipality in Innlandet county, Norway. It is located in the Jotunheimen mountain range and also inside Jotunheimen National Park. The lake is located between Gjende lake and Leirungåse river. The lake Bukkehåmårtjønne lies just south of this lake.

See also
List of lakes in Norway

References

Vågå
Lakes of Innlandet